Helen Elizabeth Grimes (later Lindley, October 25, 1899 – March 18, 1976) was an American diver, who competed in the 1920 Summer Olympics. She was born in Minneapolis, Minnesota and died in Washington, D.C.

At the 1920 Olympics, she finished sixth in the 10 metre platform event.

References

1899 births
1976 deaths
American female divers
Olympic divers of the United States
Divers at the 1920 Summer Olympics
20th-century American women
20th-century American people